Cryptolechia viridisignata is a moth in the family Depressariidae. It was described by Strand in 1913. It is found in Equatorial Guinea.

References

Moths described in 1913
Cryptolechia (moth)
Insects of Equatorial Guinea